Te with middle hook (Ꚋ ꚋ; italics: Ꚋ ꚋ) is a letter of the Cyrillic script. 

Te with middle hook is used in the old Abkhaz and old Ossetian languages, as well as Jakovlev's Chuvash orthography.

In the modern Abkhaz language, Ҭ has replaced this letter. It represents the aspirated voiceless alveolar plosive .

Computing codes

See also 
Ҭ ҭ : Cyrillic letter Te with descender
Cyrillic characters in Unicode

Cyrillic letters with diacritics